Walker Creek may refer to:

Falkland Islands
 Walker Creek (Falkland Islands), a settlement in the Falkland Islands

United States
 Walker Creek (Apache County, Arizona),  a stream in Arizona
 Walker Creek (Marin County, California), a stream in northern California, USA
 Walker Creek (Mono County, California), a stream tributary to Rush Creek
 Walker Creek (Michigan), a stream in Michigan, USA
 Walker Creek (Virginia), a stream in southwestern Virginia, USA
 Walker Creek (West Virginia), a stream in West Virginia, USA
 Floe, West Virginia, also called Walker Creek
 See also
 Walker River, a river in Nevada, USA